Marc H. Smith (born 25 July 1963) is a French historian and palaeographer Born in Newcastle upon Tyne in England, he has both French and British citizenship.

Education 
Marc Smith obtained his archivist palaeographer degree as major (valedictorian) of the 1988 class of the École Nationale des Chartes with a thesis entitled La France et sa civilisation vues par les Italiens au XVIe, then started his career as curator at the Archives nationales (1988–1994).

Career 
A former member of the École française de Rome (1990–1993), doctor of the École pratique des hautes études with a thesis on Les Italiens à la découverte de la France au XVIe : géographie, voyages et représentations de l'espace (1993),
he was general secretary of the École nationale des chartes (1995–1998), and since professor of medieval and modern palaeography. In 2013, he was also elected director of studies at the Ecole Pratique des Hautes Etudes, section of Historical and Philological Sciences (chair of Palaeography and history of writing in Latin characters). He also taught at the University Paris-Sorbonne (1998–2000), the Columbia University of New York (2014–2016), and head of the Mellon Summer Institute in Vernacular Paleography (Center for Renaissance Studies, Newberry Library, Chicago, et Getty Research Institute, Los Angeles) for French palaeography (since 2008).

He is president of the International Committee for Latin Palaeography (2015-2020), member of the Hebrew paleography Committee, former secretary (2002-2011) and former president (2014) of the Société de l’histoire de France, co-editor of the series Monumenta Palaeographica Medii Aevi (Brepols ; with Jean-Pierre Mahé and Élisabeth Lalou), member of the editorial boards of Scriptorium, Gazette du livre médiéval, and the Ménestrel portal, member of the reading committee of Scrineum Rivista, and former editor of the Bibliothèque de l'École des chartes journal.

Work 
His research mainly concern the evolution of the Latin alphabet in its long term linguistic, technical, cognitive and cultural situations, from Roman inscriptions to digital typography. He contributed to the expertise of many manuscripts and other objects listed in public and private collections, and the restoration of the château du Bois-Orcan in Noyal-sur-Vilaine (registration of the chapel, 2008). He is preparing a catalog of calligraphic collections published by French  up to 1815, preserved in European and American collections.

Books 
 
 
 
 Avec Laura Light, Script, New York, Les Enluminures, series "Primer" (n° 9), 39 p. (SUDOC 193836718)

Scientific editions

Articles

References

External links 
 Fiche on the site of the École des Chartes

21st-century French historians
French palaeographers
French archivists
École Nationale des Chartes alumni
Academic staff of the École Nationale des Chartes
École pratique des hautes études alumni
Academic staff of the École pratique des hautes études
Scientists from Newcastle upon Tyne
1963 births
Living people